Lake Mboukou is a freshwater lake in Epena District, Republic of the Congo.

Description
Lake Mboukou is almost totally surrounded by forest except in its SW shore where the village of Mboukou is located.

Local significance
The 1996 book Congo Journey, by the British travel writer Redmond O'Hanlon, mentions this lake as a place with strong spirits according to the local people.

Ecology
This lake belongs to the  wetland area of the Réserve Communautaire du Lac Télé/Likouala-aux-Herbes. It is a Ramsar site since 18 July 1998.

References

External links
Information Sheet on Ramsar Wetlands - Réserve communautaire du Lac Télé/Likouala-aux-Herbes

Mboukou